Aida Rybalko (born 6 February 1990) is a Lithuanian figure skater. She is a two-time Lithuanian national vice-champion.

Competitive highlights

References

 

Lithuanian female single skaters
1990 births
Living people
Competitors at the 2011 Winter Universiade